Jawaharlal Navoday Vidhyalay Stadium is a cricket ground near Una, Himachal Pradesh, India.  The first recorded match held on the ground came in January 1999 when Bengal Under-16s played Madhya Pradesh Under-16s.  The ground later held a List A match in 1997 when Himachal Pradesh played the Services in the 1999/00 Ranji Trophy one-day competition.  Following this match, a first-class match was played there between the two sides in the Ranji Trophy.  Nearly ten years later the ground held five List A matches in the 2008/09 Vijay Hazare Trophy.  During the competition the Services cricket team heavily criticised the grounds playing conditions, citing the outfield as bumpy and potentially dangerous.  They also criticised its general facilities, including a lack of changing facilities, with both teams having to change in a partitioned tent.

References

External links
Jawaharlal Navoday Vidhyalay Stadium at ESPNcricinfo
Jawaharlal Navoday Vidhyalay Stadium at CricketArchive

Cricket grounds in Himachal Pradesh
Jawahar Navodaya Vidyalayas
Buildings and structures in Una district
Sports venues completed in 1991
1991 establishments in Himachal Pradesh
20th-century architecture in India